Gasthof zum Goldenen Sternen is the oldest inn in Basel, Switzerland founded in 1349. It is a part of the Swiss history, because in its rooms on 13 July 1501, the ten messengers of the Federal States were received by the Baslers for a welcome drink.

In 1964, for a road widening, it was relocated from Aeschenvorstadt. The building was dismantled brick by brick, and in 1973–74 it was rebuilt at St. Alban-Rheinweg to its original shape.

See also 
List of oldest companies

References

External links 
Homepage

Hotels in Switzerland
Restaurants in Switzerland
Companies established in the 14th century
14th-century establishments in Switzerland